Markku Tapani Pölönen (born 16 September 1957 in Eno) is a Finnish film director, screenwriter, and editor; and the owner of film production company Suomen Filmiteollisuus. Pölönen's best known work is the 2004 film Dog Nail Clipper — written and directed by Pölönen — which was honoured in five categories at the 2005 Jussi Awards (Finland's premier film awards) including Best Direction and Best Script and which film critic Jay Weissberg from Variety called Pölönen's "most mature work to date". Pölönen has received numerous additional Jussi awards, including best picture and best screenplay for Onnen Maa (1994); best picture and best director for Kivenpyörittäjän kylä (1995); and best picture, best director, and best screenplay for A Summer by the River (1999)  Pölönen has also been nominated for two other Jussis that he did not win.  Finally, many of Pölönen's films have earned best actor and best actress awards, as well.

Personal life
In Mervi Juusola's book "Levottomat aivot" (Restless Brains), Pölönen stated that he has mild Asperger's syndrome.

Select filmography

References

External links
 

1957 births
Living people
People from Joensuu
Finnish film directors
Finnish screenwriters
People with Asperger syndrome